Fair Annie is Child ballad number 62, existing in several variants.

Synopsis

A lord tells Fair Annie to prepare a welcome for his bride, and to look like a maiden.  Annie laments that she has borne him seven sons and is pregnant with the eighth; she cannot look like a maiden.  She welcomes the bride but laments her fate, even wishing her sons evil, that they might be rats and she a cat.  The bride comes to ask her why she grieves, and then asks her what her family was before the lord stole her.  Then she reveals that she is Annie's full sister and will give her her dowry, so that Annie can marry the lord instead of her; she is a maiden still and so can return home.

Variants
Several Scandinavian variants exist:  the Swedish "Skön Anna" and the Danish "Skjön Anna" (DgF 258).  In them, the hero is a man who has newly become king, after the death of his father; his long-term mistress, Anna or Anneck, tries to get him to make her his wife, and the queen mother supports her.  When the son refuses and chooses a bride, Anneck wishes to speak with her; the queen mother brings her to the other woman, and her account makes the bride make the realization.

An earlier echo of this motif is Marie de France's lai, Le Fresne. In this twelfth-century tale, the heroine is not kidnapped but abandoned with birth tokens. Le Fresne has a twin, which was regarded as proof of adultery, and a servant abandons her to save her life. Le Fresne eventually becomes the childless concubine of a lord, whose vassals force him to take a legitimate wife to produce heirs. The bride in Le Fresne is, in fact, the other twin.

Motifs
In some variants of Hind Etin, the captive mother expresses her grief in hostility to her children in the same language as this ballad.

See also
Lord Thomas and Fair Annet

Recent recordings
The English guitarist and singer Martin Simpson recorded a version of Fair Annie on his 2001 album The Bramble Briar in his distinctive finger-picking style.

The American guitarist and singer Meg Baird and the American harpist Mary Lattimore recorded a version of Fair Annie on their 2018 album Ghost Forests.

References

External links
Fair Annie

Child Ballads